Godefroid Pelckmans (born 1854 in Turnhout) was a Belgian clergyman and prelate for the Roman Catholic Archdiocese of Lahore. He was appointed bishop in 1893. He died in 1904.

References 

1854 births
1904 deaths
Belgian Roman Catholic bishops